Arn – The Kingdom at Road's End is an epic film based on Jan Guillou's trilogy about the fictional Swedish Knights Templar Arn Magnusson. It was released to cinemas in Sweden on 22 August 2008 and is the sequel to the 2007 film Arn – The Knight Templar, but both films were combined into a single cut for the English release on DVD in 2010.

Filmed in Scotland, Sweden, Damascus, Syria and Morocco.

Plot 
The plot of the film loosely follows the book of the same name – the third volume of the Crusades trilogy, spanning the period of about 1187 to 1210.

Arn is the commander of a Templar garrison in Gaza. He is commanded to join a Templar force intercepting the army of Saladin. Due to the arrogance of the new Templar Grandmaster Gerard de Ridefort, the Crusaders are destroyed in the ensuing Battle of Hattin. Arn is wounded but Saladin recognizes him and saves Arn from execution. Arn wakes in Damascus, his wounds treated; Saladin sends him home with his friendship as he prepares to take Jerusalem.

Cecilia is finally allowed to leave the monastery where she has done penance for twenty years, meeting her son Magnus for the first time. She soon hears of the fall of Jerusalem and the destruction of the Templars and believing Arn dead decides to become a nun for the rest of her life, being offered the post of Abbess by the Folkung clan. Arn meets her as she is just about to enter the convent, and they marry at last, building an estate, Forsvik, where Arn has gathered craftsmen from all over Europe and the Holy Land. Arn is introduced to his son Magnus, born in his absence; after a little time a daughter named Alde is born, and Forsvik grows rapidly. Arn takes young men and boys to become knights-in-training.

Six years later King Canute I of Sweden dies, leaving children as heirs. King Sverker II retakes the crown with Danish help and attempts to murder the sons of Canute, prevented by the intercession of a Folkung who has tricked Sverker into thinking he was a double agent. Forced to go to war once again, the first of what is to be a nearly 600-year-long conflict between Sweden and Denmark, Arn leads the Folkung against the Sverker-Danish force at the Battle of Lena, aided by Arabic craftsmen and the Norwegian Templar, Harald Øysteinsson. Arn destroys the Danish cavalry tricking them to charge into a rain of arrows. Arn charges forward on horseback to attack King Sverker, and is intercepted by Ebbe Sunesson, the leader of the Danes; in the ensuing duel Arn kills him, taking a fatal wound in the exchange. The Folkung emerge victorious, but Arn dies of his wound upon his return to Forsvik. The film concludes with an epilogue foreshadowing the completion of the consolidation of Sweden into a unified kingdom a generation later through Birger Jarl, identified as Arn's grandson.

Cast  
 Joakim Nätterqvist as Arn Magnusson
 Sofia Helin as Cecilia Algotsdotter
 Anders Baasmo Christiansen as Harald Øysteinsson, a Norwegian Templar and Arn's trusted friend
 Morgan Alling as Eskil Magnusson, brother of Arn
 Stellan Skarsgård as Birger Brosa, uncle of Arn
 Joel Kinnaman as king Sverker Karlsson
 Gustaf Skarsgård as king Knut Eriksson, Arn's best friend
 Bill Skarsgård as Erik Knutsson, son of Knut
 Milind Soman as Saladin
 Nicholas Boulton as Gerard de Ridefort, Grandmaster of Templars
 Nijas Ørnbak-Fjeldmose as Sune Folkesson
 Martin Wallström as Magnus Månsköld, son of Arn
 Jakob Cedergren as Ebbe Sunesson
 Driss Roukhe as Fakhr
 Fanny Risberg as Queen Cecilia Blanka, wife of Knut
 Zakaria Atifi as Ibrahim
 Valter Skarsgård as Jon Knutsson
 Azher Adil as Brosoa
 Mohamed Tsouli as Village Elder
 Göran Ragnerstam as Bishop Erland
 Callum Mitchell as Viking
Barnaby Kay as Riddare

Language 
In addition to Swedish as the film's primary language, several other languages were used in the dialogue to heighten the cultural differences: Norwegian, Danish, English, and Arabic.

English was used to represent Latin and French speakers.

The part of the dialogue that is not in Swedish was subtitled in Swedish.

Music 
Music composed by Tuomas Kantelinen. Closing song by Marie Fredriksson, the lead singer for Roxette.

Reception 
Paul B. Sturtevant considers the story of Arn as an epic, but in his opinion the film narrative of Arn only turns into an epic during and after the second movie Arn - The Kingdom at Road's End, when Arn returns to Sweden bringing multicultural craftsmen and doctors to build a new home. After the victory against the Sverker Army and Danish soldiers, his legacy is ensured and revealed in the closing title of the movie: "Arn Magnusson's victory secured the peace for many years. Thanks to him, the country was soon united as the Kingdom of Sweden." The important matter for Sturtevant and the core of the movie, is the epic and myth of the national foundation of Sweden itself. He sees similarities between the myth and the contemporary Swedish self-image of a society built upon multicultural cooperation.

Sturtevant also adds that contemporary Sweden takes pride in neutrality and pacifism which is reflected in Arns's last battle speech:

"Listen to me! Have no doubt. Believe! Believe in our victory. We chose this place. Not the Danes, and not the Sverkers. We chose this time, not the Danes and not the Sverkers. Believe. God stands by those who are strong in faith. That is why we shall win and peace shall reign."

Through this statement, the fictional character Arn is paving the way for his grandson Birger Jarl, who was a real-life statesman in thirteenth-century Sweden. Sturtevant sees Arn's final act in The Kingdom at Road's End as the beginning of forging the Swedish nation and identity.

Award
The second Arn movie won the viewer's award at the 44th Guldbagge Awards.

See also 
List of historical drama films

References

Sources

External links 

2008 films
2000s action drama films
2000s historical romance films
2000s war drama films
Films based on Swedish novels
Films directed by Peter Flinth
Films set in the 12th century
Films set in the 13th century
Films set in Damascus
Films set in Sweden
Swedish sequel films
Crusades films
Knights Templar in popular culture
Films shot in Glasgow
Films shot in Morocco
Films shot in Fife
Films shot in Edinburgh
Films shot in Sweden
Swedish action films
Swedish epic films
Historical action films
Films scored by Tuomas Kantelinen
War epic films
2008 drama films
2000s Swedish films